Mitteilungen des Instituts für Österreichische Geschichtsforschung is an Austrian academic journal established in 1880 by the Institut für Österreichische Geschichtsforschung (Institute for Austrian historic research). Recent editors include Anton Scharer, Georg Scheibelreiter, and Andrea Sommerlechner.

Further reading 
 Stoy, Manfred. Das Österreichische Institut für Geschichtsforschung 1929-1945. = Mitteilungen des Instituts für Österreichische Geschichtsforschung 50. Oldenbourg, Munich 2007, .

External links

Contents list for vols. 1 (1880) – 25 (1904), by Stefan Dürr / Erlangen
Contents list for vols. 26 (1905) – 50 (1936), by Edna Staudhammer / Erlangen.
Contents list for vols. 51 (1937) – 80 (1972), by Stuart Jenks.
Contents list for vols. 81 (1973) – 111 (2003), by Stuart Jenks.
Contents list for vols. 100 (1992) – 116 (2008), or see the Oldenbourg Wissenschaftsverlag
Institut für Österreichische Geschichtsforschung

History journals
Biannual journals
Publications established in 1880
German-language journals
1880 establishments in Austria